88 may refer to: 

 88 (number)
 one of the years 88 BC, AD 88, 1888 CE, 1988 CE, 2088 CE, etc.
 "88", a song by Sum 41 from  Chuck
 "88", a song by The Cool Kids from The Bake Sale
 The 88, an American indie rock band
 The 88 (album), the 2003 debut album by New Zealand band Minuit
 Highway 88, see List of highways numbered 88
 The 88 (San Jose), a residential skyscraper in San Jose, California, USA
 The 88, a nickname for the piano derived from the number of keys it typically has
 A Morse code abbreviation meaning "Love and kisses"
 88 Generation Students Group, a Burmese pro-democracy movement
 8.8 cm Flak 18/36/37/41, known as the eighty-eight, a German anti-tank and anti-aircraft gun from World War II
 88 (film), a 2015 film directed by April Mullen, starring Katharine Isabelle
 Atomic number 88: radium
 The butterfly genus Diaethria, which has an 88-like pattern on its wings
 The butterfly genus Callicore, which has an 88-like pattern on its wings
 88, a code number for "Heil Hitler" based on "H" being the eighth letter of the alphabet

See also

 
 
 
 Squadron 88, an Australian far-right extremist group
 Unit 88, a New Zealand neo-Nazi group of the 1990s